Wind-and-fire wheels are melee weapons, wielded as a pair, associated with Chinese martial arts such as baguazhang and taijiquan. Visually, they are similar to chakrams, although unlike chakrams they are not throwing weapons.

Each wheel is a flat metal ring approximately 38 cm (about 15 inches) in diameter. One quarter-segment has a padded grip with a cross-guard; the other three segments have protruding flame-styled blades. With one wheel in each hand, the practitioner can slash, stab, parry, or disarm an opponent.

In the mythological story Fengshen Yanyi, the Immortal Taiyi gave Nezha a wind-wheel and a fire-wheel. These were stood on whilst chanting incantations, to serve as a magic vehicle.

See also

 Batarang
 Boomerang
 Chakram
 Deer horn knives, a similar weapon
 Kunai
 Makibishi
 Shuriken

References

Ancient weapons
Blade weapons
Chinese melee weapons
Fist-load weapons